The Amarena cherry  cherry grown in Bologna and Modena, two cities of Italy. It is usually bottled in syrup and used as a decoration on rich chocolate desserts.

The Amarena is a variety of the Prunus cerasus developed by Gennaro Fabbri who was born in 1869 in Bologna, Italy. His wife, Rachele, took over an old general store in Portomaggiore, which was near a wild black cherry orchard. She picked the cherries and cooked them in sugar in copper pots. To thank his wife for the treat, he bought a ceramic jar from Riccardo Gatti, an artist from Faenza. The white and blue ceramic jar was then used to sell the syrup and start a small company.

He started commercial production of cherry related products in 1905 under the Fabbri brand. The Fabbri company is still family owned, and produces a number of natural cherry pastries, syrups, and beverages.

References

External links

Cherry cultivars
Sour cherries